Cătălin Chiș (born 6 January 1988) is a Romanian former professional footballer who played as a midfielder. He ended his career at only 25 years after a serious injury suffered in the match Ceahlăul Piatra Neamț–CFR Cluj 2-2, played on 27 July 2012. In his short career Chiș was remarked at Bihor Oradea where he was one of the team's leaders in the 2010-11 campaign, at the end of which the team from Oradea should be promoted to Liga I. After the retirement Chiș started his coach career at youth level and also activated as a referee for a short period.

References

External links
 

1988 births
Living people
People from Zalău
Romanian footballers
Association football midfielders
Liga I players
Liga II players
CF Liberty Oradea players
FC Bihor Oradea players
FC Politehnica Timișoara players
CSM Ceahlăul Piatra Neamț players
Romanian football managers